Adaptatsiya (Russian for Adaptation) is a Kazakhstani  punk rock band  founded in 1992 in  Aktobe.

History

Yermen Anti Erzhanov was born on 26 July 1974.  In 1992 Yermen formed the Adaptatsiya. The inspiration for him were Grazhdanskaya Oborona and Alexander Bashlachev.

Members

(in 2014)
 Yermen Anti Erzhanov - vocals, guitar, author of music and lyrics
  - bass
  - guitar
 - drums

Lyrics

Adaptatsiya is Russian language band, but some songs are in Kazakh. Adaptatsiya has lyrics dealing with social issues

Discography

 Колесо истории – 1997
 На нелегальном положении – 1998
 Джут – 2001
 Punk rock du Kazakhstan – 2003
 За измену Родине – 2003
 Уносимся прочь – 2005
 Так горит степь – 2005
 Время убийц – 2008 
 Песни любви и протеста – 2009
 No pasaran! – 2011 
 Пластилин – 2013 
 Передвижные Хиросимы (трибьют-альбом) – 2013
 Цинга -2015
 Radio Resistance - 2017
 Олдскул - 2017

See also

 Music of Kazakhstan
 Russian rock

References

External links
 Adaptatsiya - official website
 Adaptatsiya - official blog
 Adaptatsiya - fan-website

  Interview with  Yermen Anti in Limonka 
  Interview with Yermen Anti  on YouTube

Kazakhstani rock music groups
Kazakhstani punk rock groups
Kazakhstani alternative rock groups
Musical groups established in 1992